Simpson Glacier is a glacier, 6 miles (10 km) long, in the Admiralty Mountains. It flows northward to the coast between Nelson Cliff and Mount Cherry-Garrard where it forms the Simpson Glacier Tongue. The latter feature was named by the British Antarctic Expedition, 1910–13, after Sir George Simpson, meteorologist of the expedition. The glacier described was mapped by United States Geological Survey (USGS), 1960–63,a and was so named by Advisory Committee on Antarctic Names (US-ACAN) because (with Fendley Glacier to the east) it nourishes the Simpson Glacier Tongue.

Admiralty Mountains
Glaciers of Pennell Coast